"Take Your Daughter To Work Day" is the eighteenth episode of the second season of the American comedy television series The Office, and the show's twenty-fourth episode overall. It was written by Mindy Kaling and directed by Victor Nelli, Jr. It first aired on March 16, 2006, on NBC. The episode guest stars Jazz Raycole as Melissa Hudson, Delaney Ruth Farrell as Sasha Flenderson, Spencer Daniels as Jake Palmer, and Jake Kalender as a young Michael Scott.

The series depicts the everyday lives of office employees in the Scranton, Pennsylvania branch of the fictional Dunder Mifflin Paper Company.  In this episode, Take Your Daughter to Work Day results in four children spending the day at the office—Toby Flenderson's (Paul Lieberstein) daughter Sasha, Stanley Hudson's (Leslie David Baker) daughter Melissa, Kevin Malone's (Brian Baumgartner) fiancée's daughter Abby, and Meredith Palmer's (Kate Flannery) son Jake. Pam Beesly (Jenna Fischer) tries to befriend at least one child and ends up doing so by befriending Jake. Melissa develops a crush on Ryan Howard (B. J. Novak), Michael Scott (Steve Carell) develops a friendship with Sasha, and tries to impress the children by claiming he was a child star, and Dwight Schrute (Rainn Wilson) struggles to show secret girlfriend Angela Martin (Angela Kinsey) that he can be stern with Jake.

"Take Your Daughter to Work Day" was one of the last episodes filmed for the season. Due to the presence of actual children on the set, all of the main cast members had to tone down their behavior, making sure that no one cursed or told inappropriate jokes. The installment received largely positive reviews from television critics. "Take Your Daughter to Work Day" received a Nielsen rating of 4.2 and was seen by 8.8 million viewers.

Plot
Michael Scott (Steve Carell) is frustrated that Take Your Daughter to Work Day will force him to tone down his office antics. Toby Flenderson (Paul Lieberstein) and Stanley Hudson (Leslie David Baker) bring their daughters, Sasha (Delaney Ruth Farrell) and Melissa (Jazz Raycole) respectively, Kevin Malone (Brian Baumgartner) brings his fiancée's daughter, Abby (Haley Daniels), and Meredith Palmer (Kate Flannery) brings her son, Jake (Spencer Daniels). Pam Beesly (Jenna Fischer) is determined to befriend one child by the end of the day. She tries with Abby, who instead takes a liking to Jim Halpert (John Krasinski). Jim enlists Abby in helping him make sales, Sasha walks into Michael's office and plays with his toys, and after he jokes she becomes quite fond of him.

Dwight Schrute (Rainn Wilson) begins to read one of his childhood horror stories to the children, but Michael enters and insists that he stop upsetting the kids. Michael shows the children and the office a video of him as a child (Jake Kalender) during an appearance on a kid's show, where he revealed his dream was to "get married and have 100 kids, so I can have 100 friends, and no one can say 'no' to being my friend." He retreats into his office when he realizes that he never came close to that dream. Toby talks to Michael, who decides to start online dating (with the user name "Little Kid Lover"). After being tormented by Jake all day, Dwight upsets him with a childish insult, which quietly pleases Angela Martin (Angela Kinsey). Pam wins over Jake with the paper shredder. Jim leaves the office early to go on a date, to Pam's chagrin. Michael and Dwight end the party by singing "Teach Your Children".

Production

"Take Your Daughter to Work Day" was written by Mindy Kaling, who portrayed Kelly Kapoor on the series. The episode was directed by Victor Nelli Jr., making it his second directoral credit after the earlier episode "The Carpet". The episode was one of the last installments filmed for the season. In addition, the episode took five days to film. Each day, over twelve hours was devoted to filming. The episode guest stars Jazz Raycole as Melissa Hudson, Delaney Ruth Farrell as Sasha Flenderson, Spencer Daniels as Jake Palmer, and Jake Kalender as a young Michael Scott.

Jenna Fischer noted that, due to the presence of actual children on the set, "everyone had to be on their best behavior", meaning that there was no "cursing and no dirty jokes allowed". She later said that "we aren't a 'G-rated' bunch by nature." Fischer later joked that "candy is one of my weaknesses", but she was able to get through the filming of the episode without eating any of it. She explained that during the filming of the earlier second season episodes "Halloween" and "Valentine's Day", she had eaten a majority of the candy the crew put on her desk.

The second season DVD contains a number of deleted scenes from this episode. Notable cut scenes include the Party Planning Committee squabbling over what food to serve, Stanley complaining that his daughter is spoiled, Dwight discovering an eraser in his coffee courtesy of Jake, and Jim giving Abby an official certificate of appreciation.

Cultural references
Pam notes that by putting out candy to lure in children, she is acting just like the witch in the fairy tale "Hansel and Gretel". Michael complains about having to censor himself with children around; he compares himself to Eddie Murphy in his movie Raw and notes "they" want to make him into Murphy in Daddy Day Care. Michael, Jim, and Dwight get into an argument about superheroes. Michael claims that he is like Superman defending Gotham City. Both Jim and Dwight correct him, and he says that he is more like Aquaman.

Jim and Abby discuss the book From the Mixed-Up Files of Mrs. Basil E. Frankweiler and talk whether they would want to spend a night in the Metropolitan Museum of Art or an aquarium. Sasha asks Phyllis if she is Mother Goose. Dwight later reads the short story "Die Geschichte vom Daumenlutscher" from Heinrich Hoffmann's 1845 book Struwwelpeter. Michael later refers to it as a book that Dwight's "Nazi war-criminal" grandmother read to him. This starts a short discussion about Nazis. Michael argues that Dunder Mifflin is better than Office Depot with the children. He later shows them his performance on Fundle Bundle, a parody of "those crappy little local kids' shows that used to fill time on Saturday mornings before there were such things as infomercials". Michael and Dwight end the party by performing Crosby, Stills, Nash & Young's "Teach Your Children". In an episode of the Office Ladies podcast, it was revealed that "Fundle Bundle" was based on a show called "The Land Of Hatchy Milatchy" which aired in Scranton in the 1980s.

Reception
"Take Your Daughter to Work Day" originally aired on NBC on March 16, 2006. The episode received a 4.2 rating/11 percent share among adults between the ages of 18 and 49. This means that it was seen by 4.2 percent of all 18- to 49-year-olds, and 11 percent of all 18- to 49-year-olds watching television at the time of the broadcast. The episode was viewed by 8.8 million viewers, and retained 93 percent of its lead-in My Name is Earl audience.

The episode received largely positive reviews from critics. Francis Rizzo III of DVD Talk called the scene where the office realizes Michael's loneliness "absolutely one of the saddest moments I've seen in recent memory" and noted that "you can't help but feel for him". M. Giant of Television Without Pity gave the episode an "A". Brendan Babish of DVD Verdict called the entry "another great episode" for the series and awarded it an "A−". He noted that by bringing the supporting characters' kids into the office "hilarity ensues". Babish applauded the lack of an arching plot, allowing "Michael's faux pas" to take center stage. Michael Sciannamea of AOLTV called "Take Your Daughter to Work Day" the "best episode yet this season" and noted that "the writers will be hard-pressed to come up with a better story than this one." Sciannamea called "the transformation of Michael's indifference over the kids to one of acceptance and pure enjoyment of having them around" as the "most interesting aspect of the episode". He also called Dwight and Michael's sing-along near the end "the single funniest moment of the season".

References

External links
 "Take Your Daughter to Work Day" at NBC.com
 

2006 American television episodes
The Office (American season 2) episodes
Television episodes written by Mindy Kaling